The 2009 Little League Philippine Series was held from April 13 to 19, 2009.  The venue of the tournament was the city of Manila.  91 teams joined in the various baseball and softball age divisions of Little League. This is an annual event and winners represent Little League Philippines at the Asia Pacific Regional Tournaments held in June and July.

Little League Baseball (11 to 12 Years Old)

First round standings

Playoffs

Round of 16 April 18

Lipa, Batangas 13   Manila 1

ILLAM 6   Los Banos 5

Cavite 14   Kalinga 0

Tanauan, Batangas 17   Caloocan 9

Marikina 19   Valenzuela 0

Bulacan 14   Taguig 1

Calamba, Laguna 13   Antipolo 3

Muntinlupa 21   General Trias 10

Quarter-final April 18

Marikina 11   Bulacan  	1

Cavite 5   Tanauan, Batangas 4

ILLAM 16   Lipa, Batangas 2

Muntinlupa 7   Calamba, Laguna 6

Semi-finals April 19

Muntinlupa 10  Marikina 2

ILLAM 19   Cavite 9

Championship April 19

ILLAM 9   Muntinlupa 2

Junior League Baseball (13-14 Years Old)

Semi-final

Muntinlupa 4   Marikina 3

Tanauan 12   ILLAM 10

Championship

Muntinlupa 12   Tanauan 1

Senior League Baseball (14-16 Years Old)

Championship

ILLAM 15  Tanauan 5

Big League Baseball (16-18 Years Old)

Championship
Tanauan 3   ILLAM 2

Little League Softball (11-12 Years Old)

Championship
Cavite 12   Palayan 11

Junior League Softball (13-14 Years Old)

Championship
ILLAM 5   Bacolod East 2

Senior League Softball (13-16 Years Old)

Championship
ILLAM 7   Bacolod West 2

Big League Softball

Championship
Rizal 3   ILLAM 2

See also
 2008 Little League Philippine Series
Junior, Senior & Big League Baseball

References
http://www.philstar.com/Article.aspx?articleId=455139&publicationSubCategoryId=69 (Archived 2009-09-28)
http://www.gmanews.tv/story/155479/Record-92-teams-compete-in-Philippine-Little-League-Series (Archived 2009-09-28)
http://philbaseball.blogspot.com/2009/05/2009-little-league-philippine-series.html (Archived 2009-09-28)
https://web.archive.org/web/20120311100111/http://sports.inquirer.net/sport/baseball/view/20090831-222815/US-takes-Little-League-World-Series-title
https://web.archive.org/web/20120920000910/http://newsinfo.inquirer.net/breakingnews/sports/view/20070827-8489/US_downs_Japan_for_Little_League_World_Series_crown

External links
http://www.littleleague.org/
https://web.archive.org/web/20080501121939/http://www.muntinlupalittleleague.org/
https://web.archive.org/web/20090916193453/http://firequinito.com/archives/114-Airing-tonight-The-Tondo-version-of-the-Bad-News-Bears-on-i-Witness.html

Baseball competitions in the Philippines
>
2009 in Philippine sport